Valiji Mahalleh (also Romanized as Valījī Maḩalleh; also known as Valajī Maḩalleh) is a village in Peyrajeh Rural District, in the Central District of Neka County, Mazandaran Province, Iran. At the 2006 census, its population was 279, in 74 families.

References 

Populated places in Neka County